The Luxor massacre was a terrorist attack that occurred on 17 November 1997 in Egypt. It was perpetrated by al-Jamāʻah al-Islāmīyah and resulted in the deaths of 62 people, most of whom were tourists. It took place at Dayr al-Bahri, an archaeological site located across the Nile from the city of Luxor.

Attack
Deir el-Bahari is one of Egypt's top tourist attractions, notable for the spectacular Mortuary Temple of Hatshepsut, an 18th Dynasty pharaoh. The temple is also known as Djoser-Djeseru (Holy of Holies in ancient Egyptian).

In the mid-morning attack, six gunmen killed 58 foreign nationals and four Egyptians. The assailants were armed with automatic firearms and knives, and disguised as members of the security forces. They descended on the Mortuary Temple of Hatshepsut at around 08:45. They killed two armed guards at the site. With the tourists trapped inside the temple, the killing went on systematically for 45 minutes, during which many bodies, especially of women, were mutilated with machetes. The body of an elderly Japanese man was also found mutilated. A leaflet was discovered stuffed into his body that read "no to tourists in Egypt" and was signed "Omar Abdul Rahman's Squadron of Havoc and Destruction - the Gama'a al-Islamiyya, the Islamic Group".

The dead included a five-year-old English child, Shaunnah Turner, and four Japanese couples on honeymoon. There were 26 survivors.

The attackers then hijacked a bus, but ran into a checkpoint of armed Egyptian National Police and military forces. One of the terrorists was wounded in the subsequent shootout and the rest fled into the hills where their bodies were found in a cave, apparently having committed suicide together.

One or more al-Jama'a al-Islamiyya leaflets were found calling for the release of Omar Abdel-Rahman from a U.S. prison, stating that the attack had been carried out as a gesture to exiled leader Mustafa Hamza, or declaring: "We shall take revenge for our brothers who have died on the gallows. The depths of the earth are better for us than the surface since we have seen our brothers squatting in their prisons, and our brothers and families tortured in their jails".

Casualties
Most of the victims were foreign tourists. Most of the casualties were from Switzerland, with 36 of its citizens killed. The youngest victim was a 5-year-old British child.

Responsibility
It is thought to have been instigated by exiled leaders of al-Jama'a al-Islamiyya, an Egyptian Islamist organization, attempting to undermine the organization's July 1997 "Nonviolence Initiative", to devastate the Egyptian economy and provoke the government into repression that would strengthen support for anti-government forces. However, the attack led to internal divisions among the militants, and resulted in the declaration of a ceasefire. In June 2013, the group denied that it was involved in the massacre.

Reaction
The attack took place an hour before the state visit of Queen Beatrix of the Netherlands and Prince-Consort Claus.

Following the attack, then president Hosni Mubarak replaced interior minister General Hassan Al Alfi with General Habib al-Adly. The Swiss Federal Police "later determined that bin Laden had financed the operation".

The tourist industry in Egypt, and particularly in Luxor, was seriously affected by the resultant slump in visitors and remained depressed until sinking even lower with the September 11 attacks in the United States in 2001, the 2005 Sharm el-Sheikh attacks, and the 2006 Dahab bombings.

The massacre marked a decisive drop in Islamist terrorists' fortunes in Egypt by turning public opinion overwhelmingly against them. Terrorist attacks declined dramatically following the backlash from the massacre. Organizers and supporters of the attack quickly realised that the strike had been a massive miscalculation and reacted with denials of involvement. The day after the attack, al-Gama'a al-Islamiyya leader Refa'i Ahmed Taha claimed the attackers intended only to take the tourists hostage, despite the immediate and systematic nature of the slaughter. Others denied Islamist involvement completely. Sheikh Omar Abdel-Rahman blamed Israelis for the killings, and Ayman Zawahiri maintained the attack was the work of the Egyptian police.

See also
 Terrorism in Egypt
 List of massacres in Egypt

References

External links
Tourists massacred at temple. 17 November 1997 (BBC News)
Bin Laden 'behind Luxor massacre', 13 May 1999 (BBC News)

1997 in international relations
1997 mass shootings in Africa
1997 murders in Egypt
20th-century mass murder in Africa
Attacks on tourists
Egypt–Switzerland relations
Hijacking
Islamic terrorism in Egypt
Islamic terrorist incidents in 1997
Massacres in 1997
Mass shootings in Egypt
Massacres in Egypt
Murder–suicides in Africa
November 1997 crimes
November 1997 events in Africa
Terrorist incidents in Africa in 1997
Terrorist incidents in Egypt in 1997
Theban Necropolis